Surendra Singh Jeena (8 December 1969 – 12 November 2020) was an Indian politician and member of the Bharatiya Janata Party.

Biography
Jeena was a member of the Uttarakhand Legislative Assembly from the Salt constituency in Almora district. He made it through to legislative assembly for the third time in a row. He was also the chairman of Kumaon Mandal Vikas Nigam (KMVN) in his first term. In 2007, he was elected as a member of legislative assembly from Bhikiyasain constituency. In his second term he won 2012 legislative election from Salt constituency.

MLA from Salt in Almora district, Surendra Singh Jeena, who was undergoing treatment for COVID-19 at a hospital in New Delhi, died from the virus early on 12 November 2020, a party leader said.

References 

1969 births
2020 deaths
People from Almora district
Bharatiya Janata Party politicians from Uttarakhand
Members of the Uttarakhand Legislative Assembly
Uttarakhand MLAs 2017–2022
Deaths from the COVID-19 pandemic in India